Crematogaster amapaensis is a species of ant in tribe Crematogastrini. It was described by Kempf in 1960.

References

amapaensis
Insects described in 1960